Atay Aktuğ, is the former president of the Turkish football club Trabzonspor.

Atay was a player for Trabzonspor in the late sixties and early seventies. He was voted in as president after his predecessor Özkan Sümer suddenly resigned in August 2003. He was re-elected in December 2004.

One of the main changes he has brought about is to list Trabzonspor on the Istanbul Stock Exchange, in the hope of raising funds for the club. Under his stewardship Trabzonspor has embarked on a series of tasks to raise marketing income through sponsorship and to create a large community of members throughout Turkey and Europe.

Aktuğ was the mayor of Trabzon between 1989 and 1994.

References 

Living people
Mayors of Trabzon
Year of birth missing (living people)